Cychrus moerkuaicus is a species of ground beetle in the subfamily of Carabinae. It was described by Deuve & Tian in 2007.

References

moerkuaicus
Beetles described in 2007